

The Maestranza Central de Aviación HF XX-02 was a military trainer aircraft developed in Chile in the 1950s.

Design and development
Designed by Hugo Fuentes (hence the HF in the designation), the HF XX-02 was a conventional, low-wing cantilever monoplane of mixed construction with fixed tailwheel undercarriage. The pilot and instructor sat side by side.

Two prototypes were constructed at El Bosque Air Base, designated XX-02 and XX-02B. Development was abandoned due to difficulties maneuvering at lower altitudes, which in one case, led to a crash in which the instructor was killed while attempting to land after a tight turn at low altitude.

The design was subsequently refined by Francisco Bravo and an improved version, the HFB XX-02 flew in 1958 powered by a Continental O-470 engine in place of the Ranger L-440 that powered the original.

Specifications (HFB XX-02)

Notes

References
 
 
 

HFXX02
1950s Chilean military trainer aircraft
Single-engined tractor aircraft
Low-wing aircraft
Aircraft first flown in 1954